The Third Fox Ministry was a responsible government which held power in New Zealand from June 1869 to September 1872. Although William Fox was the head of the government, he was never appointed Premier as that office had yet to be established, although he did resign the office at the end of his tenure. The Ministry was also known as the Fox-Vogel Ministry as most of the agenda was set by the Treasurer, while Fox busied himself with administrative affairs and moral crusades such as the attempted introduction of local option polls for liquor licensing.

Background
The provincialist faction behind William Fox defeated the Stafford Ministry in 1869 with a 40–29 no-confidence motion over the sacking of Donald McLean as Government Agent in the Native Department. McLean, also a Member of the House of Representatives, was appointed Native Minister in the new Ministry and focused largely on his own portfolio: his aim was to ‘glide into a state of peace’ by ending confiscation of Maori land. Other than Maori policy, the rest of the Government’s ideas were unclear at first. They attempted to cut central government spending while removing restrictions on provincial borrowing. Isaac Featherston grew detached from the Ministry due to its “inflexible” provincialism and was sent to London with Dillon Bell to request that the Imperial Government retain two Army regiments in New Zealand and guarantee a £1 million loan – they were successful only in the second objective.

By the time they returned to New Zealand, however, Treasurer Julius Vogel had presented his 1870 Budget, which envisaged £10 million in expenditure on Public Works and Immigration, £6 million of this to be funded by fresh borrowing. Vogel’s idea was to boost the colonisation process and end the economic stagnation engendered by the wars of the 1860s. The Great Public Works policy attracted widespread support, especially from Members whose electorates stood to gain a bridge or railway line. However, critics condemned Vogel’s preparedness to encourage local greed and the lack of parliamentary oversight about how the funds were spent. On a trip to Britain, Vogel arranged a construction contract with the Brogdens firm which he had no authority to make, and it was heavily amended by the Opposition when he returned. The policy made no detailed provisions for settling immigrants, as this was still a responsibility of the Provinces.

The Fox-Vogel Ministry started off with relatively few Ministers, and Vogel spent much of its duration abroad, so it gained a reputation as a fairly weak team: William Gisborne was criticised for holding a civil service job (unpaid) while he was a Government Minister, and despite regarding himself as an administrator he often had to lead the House in the absence of other Ministers. Henry Sewell joined the Ministry from Opposition in 1870 to lead it in the Legislative Council and to make it more ‘cautious’ in policy, but ended up being asked to resign for refusing to bring Vogel’s bills into the upper house. He was replaced by George Waterhouse, who filled in for three weeks and then resigned to pursue his own business interests. Finally John Hall, another former oppositionist, filled the role of presenting government measures in the Council.

This Ministry presented a high number of bills which were withdrawn or defeated, and finally in 1872 it was defeated in a confidence motion by Edward Stafford – however, Stafford’s attempted takeover was not successful and most of Fox’s ministers returned in the Waterhouse Ministry. This was the beginning of the idea of a Continuous Ministry.

Ministers
The following members served in the Fox Ministry:

See also
 New Zealand Government

Notes

References

Ministries of Queen Victoria
Governments of New Zealand
19th century in New Zealand
Cabinets established in 1869
Cabinets disestablished in 1872